Scott Duvall is a retired Canadian politician who served as the member of Parliament for Hamilton Mountain from 2015 until 2021. He had previously served on Hamilton City Council representing Ward 7 (Central Mountain) from 2006 until he was elected to the House of Commons following the 2015 Canadian federal election. He was a member of the New Democratic Party.

Prior to being elected to Hamilton City Council, Duvall was a steelworker and a labour union president.  Throughout the entirety of his career, he was vocal about labour issues in the Hamilton area.

Background 
Duvall is a Hamilton area native, born into a household with seven other siblings. He began his career working at Stelco, where his father also worked. Duvall and his wife Sherry have three daughters. He eventually became the president of his union.

Municipal politics 
After incumbent Ward 7 councillor Bill Kelly stood unsuccessfully as the Liberal candidate for Parliament on Hamilton Mountain in 2006, he announced he would not seek re-election to Hamilton City Council. Duvall, then the president of United Steelworkers Local 5338, was one of the highest profile candidates to replace Kelly. The campaign was contentious, and featured a Cable 14 debate which local media called "a raucous showdown" during which the candidates "accused each other of various indiscretions or misleading the voters." Duvall beat eight candidates, winning by a margin of over 10% compared to his next closest competitor.

While Duvall was a city councillor, he sat as the chair of the city's Steel Issues Subcommittee.

Federal politics

First Term 
On January 5, 2015, Duvall was selected as the NDP candidate for the Hamilton Mountain riding, after the resignation of long time NDP MP Chris Charlton. Following a tight nomination battle with former Ontario NDP candidate Bryan Adamczyk, Duvall won the nomination race.

Duvall was appointed the New Democratic Party critic for Pensions in the 42nd Parliament.

On November 6, 2017, Duvall introduced a private member's bill, Bill C-384 "An Act to amend the Bankruptcy and Insolvency Act and the Companies’ Creditors Arrangement Act (pension plans and group insurance programs)". This bill sought to amend the priority given to pensioners, in the case of bankruptcy proceedings by Canadian companies. This bill was largely in response to the underfunding of pension plans in the Bankruptcy proceedings of prominent Canadian companies Nortel and Sears Canada. Duvall has gone to multiple ridings across Canada in 2017 and 2018, to discuss the implications of the current pension laws.

Second Term 
On November 13, 2018, Duvall was nominated again to run in the 2019 federal election. He has said that previous NDP leader Jack Layton inspired him to join federal politics. He also stated that issues such as pay equity, and pension reformation are his top priorities.

On March 5, 2021, Duvall announced that he would not seek re-election during the 2021 Canadian federal election. Duvall expressed a desire to spend more time with his family after over a decade in elected office. He was succeeded by Liberal candidate Lisa Hepfner.

Electoral record

Federal

Municipal 

|- style="background-color:#fcfcfc;"
!rowspan="2" colspan="2" style="text-align:center;" |Candidate
!colspan="3" style="text-align:center;" |Popular vote
!rowspan="2" colspan="2" style="text-align:center;" |Expenditures
|- style="background-color:#fcfcfc;"
| style="text-align:center;" | Votes
| style="text-align:center;" |%
| style="text-align:center;" |±%
|-
| style="background-color:#FF7F00;" |
| style="text-align:left;" | Scott Duvall (incumbent)
| style="text-align:right;" |9,956
| style="text-align:right;" |79.12%
| style="text-align:right;" |+21.51%
| style="text-align:right;" |$16,626.25
|-
| style="background-color:#aaf442;" |
| style="text-align:left;" | Keith Beck
| style="text-align:right;" |1,562
| style="text-align:right;" |12.41%
| style="text-align:right;" | +7.27
| style="text-align:right;" | $0
|-
| style="background-color:#FFFFFF;" |
| style="text-align:left;" | Greg Burghall
| style="text-align:right;" |1,065
| style="text-align:right;" |8.46%
| style="text-align:right;" | –
| style="text-align:right;" | n/a1
|-
| style="text-align:right;background-color:#FFFFFF;" colspan="2" |Total votes
| style="text-align:right;background-color:#FFFFFF;" |13,068
| style="text-align:right;background-color:#FFFFFF;" |31.75%
| style="text-align:right;background-color:#FFFFFF;" |−8.15%
| style="text-align:right;background-color:#FFFFFF;" |
|- 
| style="text-align:right;background-color:#FFFFFF;" colspan="2" |Registered voters
| style="text-align:right;background-color:#FFFFFF;" |
| style="text-align:right;background-color:#FFFFFF;" |
| style="text-align:right;background-color:#FFFFFF;" |
| style="text-align:right;background-color:#FFFFFF;" |
|- 
| style="text-align:left;" colspan="6" |1 These candidates did not submit official Financial Statements and are, therefore, ineligible to run in the  2018 Municipal election  Note: All Hamilton Municipal Elections are officially non-partisan.  Note: Candidate campaign colours are based on the prominent colour used in campaign items (signs, literature, etc.)and are used as a visual differentiation between candidates.
|- 
| style="text-align:left;" colspan="13" |Sources: City of Hamilton, "Nominated Candidates"
|}
|- style="background-color:#fcfcfc;"
!rowspan="2" colspan="2" |Candidate
!colspan="3" |Popular vote
|- style="background-color:#fcfcfc;"
! Votes
! %
! ±%
|-
| style="background-color:#FF7F00;" |
| style="text-align:left;" | Scott Duvall (incumbent)
| style="text-align:right;" |9,027	
| style="text-align:right;" |57.61%
| style="text-align:right;" |+28.05%
|-
| style="background-color:#0047AB;" |
| style="text-align:left;" | Trevor Pettit
| style="text-align:right;" |3,938	
| style="text-align:right;" |25.13%
| style="text-align:right;" |n/a
 |-
| style="background-color:#FF003F;" |
| style="text-align:left;" | John Gallagher
| style="text-align:right;" |1,899	
| style="text-align:right;" |12.12%
| style="text-align:right;" |+2.91%
|-
| style="background-color:#aaf442;" |
| style="text-align:left;" | Keith Beck
| style="text-align:right;" |805	
| style="text-align:right;" |5.14%
| style="text-align:right;" |n/a
|-
| style="text-align:right;background-color:#FFFFFF;" colspan="2" |Total votes
| style="text-align:right;background-color:#FFFFFF;" |16,173
| style="text-align:right;background-color:#FFFFFF;" |100%
| style="text-align:right;background-color:#FFFFFF;" |
|- 
| style="text-align:right;background-color:#FFFFFF;" colspan="2" |Registered voters
| style="text-align:right;background-color:#FFFFFF;" |40,571
| style="text-align:right;background-color:#FFFFFF;" |39.9 %
| style="text-align:right;background-color:#FFFFFF;" |+2.97%
|- 
| style="text-align:left;" colspan="6" |Note: All Hamilton Municipal Elections are officially non-partisan.  Note: Candidate campaign colours are based on the prominent colour used in campaign items (signs, literature, etc.)and are used as a visual differentiation between candidates.
|- 
| style="text-align:left;" colspan="13" |Sources: Hamilton, Ontario, City Clerk's Office
|}

|- style="background-color:#fcfcfc;"
!rowspan="2" colspan="2" style="text-align:center;" |Candidate
!colspan="3" style="text-align:center;" |Popular vote
|- style="background-color:#fcfcfc;"
| style="text-align:center;" | Votes
| style="text-align:center;" |%
| style="text-align:center;" |±%
|-
| style="background-color:#FF7F00;" |
| style="text-align:left;" | Scott Duvall
| style="text-align:right;" | 4,111
| style="text-align:right;" | 29.56%
| style="text-align:right;" | -
|-
| style="background-color:#51E5FF;" |
| style="text-align:left;" | Dennis Haining
| style="text-align:right;" | 2,554
| style="text-align:right;" | 18.36%
| style="text-align:right;" | -
|-
| style="background-color:#702632;" |
| style="text-align:left;" | Dave Shuttleworth
| style="text-align:right;" | 2,509
| style="text-align:right;" | 18.04%
| style="text-align:right;" | -
|-
| style="background-color:#FF003F;" |
| style="text-align:left;" | John Gallagher
| style="text-align:right;" | 1,281
| style="text-align:right;" | 9.21%
| style="text-align:right;" | +1.11%
|-
| style="background-color:#48A9A6;" |
| style="text-align:left;" | Mark DiMillo
| style="text-align:right;" | 1,179
| style="text-align:right;" | 8.48%
| style="text-align:right;" | -
|-
| style="background-color:#25291C;" |
| style="text-align:left;" | Mark Harrington
| style="text-align:right;" | 1,031
| style="text-align:right;" | 7.41%
| style="text-align:right;" | -
|-
| style="background-color:#F0E100;" |
| style="text-align:left;" | Tim Nolan
| style="text-align:right;" | 994
| style="text-align:right;" | 7.15%
| style="text-align:right;" | -
|-
| style="background-color:#274690;" |
| style="text-align:left;" | Mark-Alan Whittle
| style="text-align:right;" | 249
| style="text-align:right;" | 1.79%
| style="text-align:right;" | -
|-
| style="text-align:right;background-color:#FFFFFF;" colspan="2" |Total votes
| style="text-align:right;background-color:#FFFFFF;" |14,209
| style="text-align:right;background-color:#FFFFFF;" |100%
| style="text-align:right;background-color:#FFFFFF;" |
|- 
| style="text-align:right;background-color:#FFFFFF;" colspan="2" |Registered voters
| style="text-align:right;background-color:#FFFFFF;" |38,478
| style="text-align:right;background-color:#FFFFFF;" |36.93%
| style="text-align:right;background-color:#FFFFFF;" |
|- 
| style="text-align:left;" colspan="6" |Note: All Hamilton Municipal Elections are officially non-partisan.  Note: Candidate campaign colours are based on the prominent colour used in campaign items (signs, literature, etc.)and are used as a visual differentiation between candidates.
|- 
| style="text-align:left;" colspan="13" |Sources: Hamilton, Ontario, City Clerk's Office
|}

References

External links 
 
 

Canadian trade unionists
Living people
Hamilton, Ontario city councillors
Members of the House of Commons of Canada from Ontario
New Democratic Party MPs
United Steelworkers people
21st-century Canadian politicians
1956 births